The 2023 UCLA Bruins softball team represents the University of California, Los Angeles in the 2023 NCAA Division I softball season. The Bruins are coached by Kelly Inouye-Perez, in her seventeenth season. The Bruins play their home games at Easton Stadium and compete in the Pac-12 Conference.

Previous season
The Bruins finished the 2022 season 51–10 overall, and 19–5 in the Pac-12 Conference, finishing in second place in their conference. Following the conclusion of the regular season, the Bruins received an at-large bid to the 2022 NCAA Division I softball tournament where they advanced to the semifinals of the Women's College World Series, before being eliminated by eventual tournament champion Oklahoma.

Offseason
In August 2022, assistant head coaches Lisa Fernandez and Kirk Walker were promoted to associate head coaches.

Preseason

Award watch lists

Roster

Schedule

Rankings

References

UCLA
UCLA Bruins softball seasons
UCLA Bruins softball
UCLA Bruins softball